Agostino Carollo, also known as Spankox, is an Italian musician, disc jockey, singer and producer who is currently signed with EMI.  Originally a classical violinist, he specializes in pop and dance music, including remixes of songs such as KC and the Sunshine Band's That's the Way. He has also released such records as X-Treme, Eyes Cream, Ago, K-Roll, Tino Augusto DJ, DJ B3LFAST, DJ Rikituki and Spankox. Several of his songs have appeared in the Dancemania compilation series and Dance Dance Revolution video game series under the name X-Treme.

Career
In 1998 he wrote and produced under the name X-Treme the European hit "Love Song", that achieved the gold record status in several territories. 

In 1999 he wrote, sang and produced under the name Eyes Cream the Billboard US Dance No. 1 hit "Fly Away (Bye Bye)"

In 2002 he worked with fellow Italian DJ and producer Gigi d'Agostino on his composition "Put on Your Red Shoes". The record, released under his nickname Ago, became the No. 1 summer dance hit in Italy and hit the Top 20 sales chart in Germany and the Top 10 in Scandinavia.

In the same year he wrote and produced again under the name Eyes Cream another Billboard US Top 10 hit: "Open Up Your Mind".

He also co-produced Snap!'s hit "The Power of Bhangra". and worked as remixer for artists such as Roxette and Vasco Rossi.

Also 2002 the famous band Right Said Fred covered his song "Love Song" and included the song in their album "Fredhead".

Right Said Fred's rendition of "Love Song" was released as single by Sony BMG and reached n. 21 in the Official German Sales Chart remaining in the Top 40 for more than 4 months.

In 2004 he wrote and produced the club anthem entitled "To the Club".

In 2005 he produced a project called "Jumpy" that hit the French and Belgium Top 40 sales chart.

In 2007 he wrote and produced the song "Come Vasco Rossi", which was performed by his daughters under their band name Gaia & Luna and became the top selling single in Italy for five weeks, and the fifth most downloaded track of the year

In 2008 he became the third official Elvis Presley's remixer in history when his remix of "Baby Let's Play House" was released worldwide, topping the charts in several Countries.

At the end of 2008, SonyBMG UK released the first Elvis Presley's remix album called "Re:Versions", supported by the Elvis Presley Estate, and entirely produced by Agostino Carollo. Warner Music released the album in Germany, where it reached the number 40 in the album charts.

On 30 October 2009 the new Elvis Presley "Re:Mixes" album, produced by Agostino Carollo aka Spankox and supported by the Elvis Presley Estate, was released on a new media called VinylDISC (CD+Vinyl in one). 

He has been performing as DJ in several of the best clubs in the world, and more recently he has been Saturday's resident guest DJ at Mallorca's superclub BCM 

During the summer of 2010 his record "So True", released as Spankox, hit the charts in Spain. A few months later it was licensed to the legendary New York based record label Nervous Records that released it in the USA under the name Ago. The record got immediately a fantastic reaction and reached on 19 March 2011 the n. 10 of the Billboard USA Dance Radio Airplay Chart. It remained in the Top 50 for more than three months.

On 9 April 2011 his new record "Michael Jackson Is Not Dead" reached the n.6 in the UK House Chart and n. 14 in the DMC World House Chart. In July 2011 it reached the n.1 of the UK album charts included in the compilation "Clubland 19" as a special mash up with "45" by Stars.

In August 2011 the new Elvis Presley "Re:Volution" album produced by Agostino Carollo aka Spankox was released receiving excellent reviews.

In October 2011 he produced and co-wrote a new single for Eddy Wata, entitled "Senorita".

In February 2012 a new Elvis Presley remix album entitled "Re:Loaded" was released, produced by Agostino Carollo aka Spankox, including ten remixes. The album was immediately billed by Elvis fans "the best Elvis Presley remix album ever".

In April 2012 a cooperation with the Spanish king of pop Miguel Bosé lead to the release of the single "Wrong In The Right Way" by Spankox & Miguel Bosé. The song was entirely written and produced by Agostino Carollo. 

On 8 January 2013, a new Elvis Presley remix album entitled "Re:Born" was released, produced by Agostino Carollo aka Spankox, including ten remixes. The album soon became a must-have among Elvis fans.

In July 2013, the single "Makaroni" by Spankox feat. Yunna was released in many territories. In Germany it reached the Top 10 of the Top 50 Dance Chart and Ago performed it in the "Ballermann Hits" TV show recorded in Mallorca and aired by RTL II TV for more than 18 million viewers in Germany.

In November 2013 he was officially nominated at the Latin Grammy Awards as songwriter, featured artist and producer of the album of the year for his duet with Miguel Bosé "Wrong In The Right Way" included in the album "Papitwo".

In March 2014 the album "Reloved" by the Beatles, produced by Agostino Carollo, was released in Israel and South Africa.

In 2016 he wrote, sung and produced the Euro 2016 hit "Will Grigg's On Fire" as DJ B3lfast.

In the same year he hit the charts again as DJ Rikituki with the track "PPAP - Pen Pineapple Apple Pen".

In 2017 Ago produced the official remix of "Periscope" by the American rock band Papa Roach, featuring Skylar Grey.

On April 22, 2018, Ago Carollo released "Acoustic EP 1", a collection of 5 songs recorded live just with piano and vocals. It features his hits "Tell Me Where You Are" and "Put On Your Red Shoes", the new song "Moonlight" and two covers: "Wake Me Up (Goodbye Avicii)" and "Knocking' On Heaven's Door".

Agostino "Ago" Carollo produced the film Miami II Ibiza, an innovative music feature featuring several world famous DJs, available on iTunes.

Agostino Carollo is also the owner of the record label Everness and the producer and artistic director of several events. Among these, two of Europe's major Music & Arts Festivals, Vivalago and EX.

Discography

Charted singles

Remixes
Stars (Remixes), 1999
Dancemania 21, 2001

Other songs
1992
A Minute
Another One Bites the Dust
Come Vasco Rossi
Dancing
Deeboudaebeedoee
Everything
Fly Away (Bye Bye)
Fly High
Happy Children
Hip Whoop
Hypnotika
I'm Your Boogie Man
It's Smoke on the Water
Jumpin
Let's All Get Up!
Livin in a Disco
Long Train Running
Love Is Your Name
Love Song
Love You Too
Magdalena
Mas Que Nada
My Fire
Michael Jackson Is Not Dead
No Corrida
No Satisfaction
On A Day
Open Up Your Mind
Perchon vi tappate la bocca
Put on Your Red Shoes
Qui Ritornera
September
Sleep All Day All Night
So True
Soul Bossa Nova
Take Me Higher
Take the Record, Daddy!
Tell Me
Tell Me Where You Are
That's The Way
The Love Album
This Is the Voice!
Up, Side, Jump!
Viva La Discoteca
Welcome You
What Do You Feel Now?
What Time Is It?
What You Dream
Wonderland Bee
Work Your Body
X-Treme
Yo Quiero Un Chico
Your Love Is Coming Down Over Me
Your Night

References

External links 

Year of birth missing (living people)
Living people
Italian pop musicians
Italian dance musicians
Italian musicians
Italian record producers
Italian film producers
Video game musicians